Below is the list of leaders of present-day Uzbekistan since the establishment of Uzbek SSR in 1924.

Leaders of Uzbekistan (1924–1991)

Uzbek Soviet Socialist Republic (1924–1991)

First Secretaries of the Communist Party

Presidents of the Republic of Uzbekistan (1991–present)
The first column consecutively numbers the individuals who have served as president, while the second column consecutively numbers the Presidential terms or administrations.

Rank by time in office

Main biographical data

See also
Politics of Uzbekistan
President of Uzbekistan
Vice President of Uzbekistan
Prime Minister of Uzbekistan

References

Politics of Uzbekistan
Government of Uzbekistan
President
Uzbekistan